ISO 3166-2:JP is the entry for Japan in ISO 3166-2, part of the ISO 3166 standard published by the International Organization for Standardization (ISO), which defines codes for the names of the principal subdivisions (e.g. provinces or states) of all countries coded in ISO 3166-1.

Currently for Japan, ISO 3166-2 codes are defined for 47 prefectures.

Each code consists of two parts, separated by a hyphen. The second part is two digits (01–47), which is the Japanese Industrial Standard JIS X 0401 code of the prefecture. The codes are assigned roughly from north to south.

Current codes
Subdivision names are listed as in the ISO 3166-2 standard published by the ISO 3166 Maintenance Agency (ISO 3166/MA).

See also
 Administrative divisions of Japan
 FIPS region codes of Japan

External links
 ISO Online Browsing Platform: JP
 Districts of Japan, Statoids.com

2:JP
ISO 3166-2
Japan geography-related lists